Kaleb J. Ramsey (born June 20, 1989) is a former American football defensive tackle. He was drafted by the San Francisco 49ers in the seventh round of the 2014 NFL Draft. He played college football at Boston College.

Professional career
Ramsey was placed on the physically unable to perform list for the start of the 2014 season due to an injury. He was released on September 5, 2015 in order for the 49ers to make their 53-man roster. He was re-signed on September 6, 2015 to the 49ers' practice squad.

On January 7, 2016, the 49ers signed Ramsey to a futures contract.

On July 28, 2016, Ramsey announced his retirement from the National Football League.

References

External links
Boston College Eagles bio
San Francisco 49ers bio

1989 births
Living people
American football defensive ends
Boston College Eagles football players
People from Uniontown, Pennsylvania
Players of American football from Pennsylvania
San Francisco 49ers players
Sportspeople from the Pittsburgh metropolitan area